Shadowsocks is a free and open-source encryption protocol project, widely used in China to circumvent Internet censorship. It was created in 2012 by a Chinese programmer named "clowwindy", and multiple implementations of the protocol have been made available since. Shadowsocks is not a proxy on its own, but (typically) is the client software to help connect to a third-party SOCKS5 proxy, which is similar to a Secure Shell (SSH) tunnel. Once connected, internet traffic can then be directed through the proxy. Unlike an SSH tunnel, shadowsocks can also proxy User Datagram Protocol (UDP) traffic.

Takedown 
On 22 August 2015, "clowwindy" announced in a GitHub thread that they had been contacted by the police and could no longer maintain the project. The code of the project was subsequently branched with a removal notice. Three days later, on 25 August, another proxy application, GoAgent, also had its GitHub repository removed. The removal of the projects got media's attention, with news outlets speculating about the possible connection between the takedowns and a distributed-denial-of-service attack targeting GitHub that happened several days later. Danny O'Brien, from Electronic Frontier Foundation, published a statement on the matter.

Despite the takedown, collaborators of the project have continued the development of the project.

Server implementations 
The original Python implementation can still be installed with Pip (package manager), but the contents of its GitHub repository have been removed. Other server implementations include one in Go, Rust, and C using the  event loop library; C++ with a Qt GUI; and Perl. The Go and Perl implementations are not updated regularly and may have been abandoned.

Client implementations 
All of the server implementations listed above also support operating in client mode. There are also client-only implementations available for Windows (shadowsocks-win), macOS (ShadowsocksX-NG), Android (shadowsocks-android), and iOS (Wingy). Many clients, including shadowsocks-win and shadowsocks-android, support redirecting all system traffic over Shadowsocks, not just applications that have been explicitly configured to do so, allowing Shadowsocks to be used similarly to a VPN. If an application doesn't support proxy servers, a proxifier can be used to redirect the application to the Shadowsocks client. Some proxifiers, such as Proxycap, support Shadowsocks directly, thus avoiding the need for a Shadowsocks client, but some require a client.

Net::Shadowsocks 
Net::Shadowsocks is name of the Perl implementation of Shadowsocks protocol client and server available on CPAN.

ShadowsocksR 
ShadowsocksR is a fork of the original Shadowsocks project, claimed to be superior in terms of security and stability. Upon release, it was found to violate the License by not having the source code of the C# client available. It was also criticized for its solution to the alleged security issues in the source project. Shadowsocks is currently under development, while development of ShadowsocksR has stopped.

Similar projects 
Shadowsocks is similar to The Tor Project's Pluggable Transport (PT) idea. PT makes it hard for Internet Service Providers to detect Tor traffic. They also both use a socks proxy interface. Whereas Shadowsocks is simpler, Obfs4 used in PT is more obfuscated. Unlike Obfs4, Shadowsocks is not resistant to Active Probing. The most similar PT to Shadowsocks is Obfs3.

See also 

 Great Firewall
 Internet censorship in China
 Outline VPN

References

External links 
 

Internet censorship in China
Free proxy servers
2012 software
Computer network security
Free software programmed in C
Free software programmed in C++
Free software programmed in C#
Free software programmed in Go
Free software programmed in Perl
Free software programmed in Python
Free software programmed in Rust